IV: Deasupra tuturor is the third studio album by Romanian hip hop group B.U.G. Mafia. It was released on November 10, 1997, by Cat Music in Romania, receiving universal acclaim from the group's fans as the way the tracks sounded was noticeably different from the previous three albums. It went on to sell over 55,000 copies with basically no promotion at all, due to the violent nature of its content, and it remains one of the best-selling hip hop albums in Romania. B.U.G. Mafia's fans have repeatedly ranked it as a classic among the group's albums.

Track listing

Track listing
All song titles, notes, samples, writing and production credits are according to the album booklet.

Lyrics by Tataee, Caddilac, Uzzi, Puya and Don Baxter.

References

External links
 IV:Deasupra Tuturor at Discogs

1997 albums
B.U.G. Mafia albums